Persatuan Sepakbola Kota Binjai (simply known as PSKB Binjai) is an Indonesian football club based in Binjai, North Sumatra. They currently compete in the Liga 3 and their homeground is Binjai Stadium.

Notable former players
  Zulkarnain Lubis
  Azwardin Lubis
  Peri Sandria
  Nasrul Koto
  Markus Haris Maulana
  Aldino Herdianto

References

External links

Binjai
Football clubs in Indonesia
Football clubs in North Sumatra